The cast of the television series MythBusters perform experiments to verify or debunk urban legends, old wives' tales, and the like. This is a list of the various myths tested on the show as well as the results of the experiments (the myth is either busted, plausible, or confirmed). The 2016 season premiered on January 2, in a Saturday time slot.

In October 2015, Hyneman and Savage confirmed that the season premiering in January 2016 would be their final season of MythBusters after over 13 years of the show.

Episode overview

Episode 237 – "MythBusters Revealed"
 Original air date: January 2, 2016

Adam and Jamie provide a behind-the-scenes look at the upcoming season, from brainstorming sessions for episode themes to test planning and execution. Footage from past episodes is shown, along with clips of the following myths and episodes to be featured during this season.

Episode 238 – "The Explosion Special"
 Original air date: January 9, 2016

In this episode, Adam and Jamie test two more explosion related myths.

MacGyver Cement Truck

Hovercraft Hijinks

Episode 239 – "Tanker Crush"
 Original air date: January 16, 2016

Adam and Jamie devote the entire episode to testing a single railroad disaster myth.

Tanker Crush

Episode 240 – "Cooking Chaos"
 Original air date: January 23, 2016

Adam and Jamie put two food-related viral videos to the test.

Instant Shrimp

Smoothie Blast

Episode 241 – "Driven to Destruction"
 Original air date: January 30, 2016

Adam and Jamie test two myths intended to send cars in opposite directions.

Pancake Car

Car Lift

Episode 242 – "Volunteer Special"
 Original air date: February 6, 2016

Adam and Jamie tackle two myths requiring large amounts of volunteer help.

Axe vs. Gun Revisit

MythBustStore

Episode 243 – "Failure Is Not an Option!"
 Original air date: February 13, 2016

Adam and Jamie revisit three past myths based on comments and complaints from fans.

Drift Turn

What Is Bulletproof?

What Is Bombproof?

Episode 244 – "Rocketman"
 Original air date: February 20, 2016

Adam and Jamie investigate alternative rocket fuels.

Rocketmen

Episode 245 – "Reddit Special"
 Original air date: February 27, 2016

Adam and Jamie test three myths submitted by Reddit users.

Farting on FLIR

Ball Fall

Paper Bag Punch

Snoo Boom

Episode 246 – "Grand Finale"
 Original air date: March 5, 2016

Adam and Jamie look back on their time hosting the show and devise four grand-scale sendoffs.

RV Blast

Truck Wedge

Bye Bye Buster

Cement Truck

Episode 247 – "Reunion"
 Original air date: March 5, 2016

Adam, Jamie, and the Build Team (Tory Belleci, Kari Byron, and Grant Imahara) gather to reminisce about their time working together.

Episode 248 – "Duct Tape: The Return"
 Original air date: March 6, 2016 (Science)

Adam and Jamie explore two last uses for their favorite all-purpose adhesive.

Duct Tape Trebuchet

Duct Tape Seat Belt

References

General references

External links

 
 

2016
2016 American television seasons